Thomas Hale Boggs Sr. (February 15, 1914 – disappeared October 16, 1972; declared dead December 29, 1972) was an American Democratic politician and a member of the U.S. House of Representatives from New Orleans, Louisiana. He was the House majority leader and a member of the Warren Commission.

In 1972, while still majority leader, Boggs was on a fundraising drive in Alaska when the twin engine airplane he was travelling in (along with Alaska congressman Nick Begich and two others) disappeared en route from Anchorage to Juneau, Alaska.

Early life and education
Boggs was born in Long Beach in Harrison County on the Mississippi Gulf Coast, the son of Claire Josephine (Hale) and William Robertson "Will" Boggs. Boggs was educated at Tulane University where he received a bachelor's degree in journalism in 1934 and a law degree in 1937. He first practiced law in New Orleans but soon became a leader in the movement to break the power of the political machine of U.S. Senator Huey Pierce Long Jr., who was assassinated in 1935. Long had previously broken the power of New Orleans politicians in 1929.

Career

U.S. House 
A Democrat running as an anti-Long candidate, Boggs was elected to the U.S. House for the Second District and served from 1941 to 1943. At the time he was elected he was, at 27, the youngest member of Congress.

His initial election was not without controversy; five of his political allies who served as Orleans Parish election commissioners were convicted of changing 97 votes for Boggs's Democratic primary opponents into votes for Boggs. The case, United States v. Classic, reached the Supreme Court, where it established the federal government's authority to regulate local primary elections, setting a key precedent for later civil rights decisions.

After an unsuccessful re-election bid in 1942, Boggs joined the United States Navy as an ensign. He served the remainder of World War II.

Gubernatorial bid

After the war, Boggs began his political comeback. He was again elected to Congress in 1946 and was then re-elected thirteen times, once just after he disappeared, but before he was presumed dead. In 1951, Boggs launched an ill-fated campaign for governor of Louisiana. Leading in the polls early in the campaign, he was soon put on the defensive when another candidate, Lucille May Grace, at the urging of long-time southeastern Louisiana political boss Leander Perez, questioned Boggs's membership in the American Student Union in the 1930s. By 1951, the ASU was thought to be a Communist front. Boggs avoided the question and attacked both Grace and Perez for conducting a smear campaign against him. In his book, The Big Lie, author Garry Boulard suggests strongly that Boggs was a member of the ASU but tried to cover up that fact in the different political climate of the early 1950s.

Boggs finished third in the balloting for governor early in 1952. The Boggs candidate for lieutenant governor, C.E. "Cap" Barham of Ruston, prevailed in a runoff election against future Governor John McKeithen. The Boggs choice for register of state lands, Ellen Bryan Moore of Baton Rouge, won the office vacated by Lucille May Grace. Moore defeated Mary Evelyn Dickerson, future state treasurer in the second McKeithen administration. Two other Boggs candidates were defeated, including State Senator Chester J. Coco of Marksville for attorney general, who lost to Fred S. LeBlanc, the former mayor of Baton Rouge, and Douglas Fowler of Coushatta, defeated by Allison Kolb of Baton Rouge, who later switched to Republican affiliation.

Boggs won the gubernatorial endorsement of the Shreveport Times, which hailed him for having stopped the Truman administration from "altering oil-depletion allowances in federal taxation, thus blocking... efforts to tie a millstone around the neck of the petroleum industry of Louisiana".The Times, in a dig at Miss Grace, also cited Boggs's fight in Congress as early as 1941 against communism and subversion in government. Other newspapers supporting Boggs were the since defunct Monroe Morning World and the functioning Monroe News-Star.

Senator Russell B. Long endorsed Boggs, but many in the Long faction had preferred Judge Carlos Spaht of Baton Rouge, who ultimately lost the runoff election to another judge, Robert F. Kennon of Minden, whom Russell Long had narrowly defeated in the special Senate election in 1948.

The Boggs Act of 1952, sponsored by Hale Boggs, set mandatory sentences for drug-related offenses. A first-offense conviction for marijuana possession carried a minimum sentence of 2 to 10 years with a fine of up to $20,000.

Later House elections

In 1960, the Republican Elliot Ross Buckley, a cousin of William F. Buckley Jr.'s, challenged Boggs but got only 22,818 votes (22 percent) to the incumbent's 81,034 ballots (78 percent). The Kennedy-Johnson ticket easily won in Louisiana that year.

In 1962, 1964 and 1968, David C. Treen, a Metairie lawyer who became the first Louisiana Republican governor in 1980, challenged Boggs for reelection. Treen built on Buckley's efforts in the first contest, and Goldwater's momentum in Louisiana helped in the second race. It was in the 1968 election, however, that Treen fared the best: 77,633 votes (48.8 percent) to Boggs's 81,537 ballots (51.2 percent). Treen attributed Boggs's victory to the supporters of former Alabama Governor George C. Wallace Jr., who ran for president on the American Independent Party ticket. Treen said that Wallace supporters "became very cool to my candidacy. We couldn't really believe they would support Boggs, but several Democratic organizations did come out for Wallace and Boggs, and he received just enough Wallace votes to give him the election."

During his tenure in Congress, Boggs was an influential member. After Brown v. Board of Education, he signed the 1956 Southern Manifesto condemning desegregation. Boggs voted against the Civil Rights Acts of 1957, 1960 and 1964, but voted in favor of the Voting Rights Act of 1965 and the Civil Rights Act of 1968. He was instrumental in passage of the interstate highway program in 1956.

Boggs was the youngest member of the Warren Commission, which, from 1963 to 1964, investigated the assassination of John F. Kennedy. Boggs has been reported to have differing positions regarding the Warren report. Based upon Office of the House Historian and Clerk of the House Office of Art and Archives, Politico reports that "Boggs dissented from the commission's majority report which supported the single bullet thesis — pointing to a lone assassin. Boggs said he "had strong doubts about it". But in a 1966 appearance on Face the Nation, Boggs defended the commission's findings and stated that he did not doubt that Lee Harvey Oswald killed Kennedy. He said that all the evidence indicated that Kennedy was shot from behind and that the argument that one bullet hit both Kennedy and Texas Governor John Connally was "very persuasive". Boggs took issue with the assertions of Warren Commission critics and stated that it was "human nature" that "many people would prefer to believe there was a conspiracy". It is unknown why his position was stated in such opposite terms, but conspiracy theorists have pondered that difference as significant. In Oliver Stone's film JFK it is Sen. Russel Long who prompts Jim Garrison the District Attorney of Orleans Parish to reopen his investigation into Lee Harvey Oswalds activities in New Orleans during the summer of 1963, beginning with association with David W. Ferrie and Guy Bannister. According to author Joan Mellen in her book A Farewell to Justice, Jim Garrison told her it was actually Hale Boggs that prompted him to reopen his investigation into the assassination of the President.

In the 1979 novel "The Matarese Circle", author Robert Ludlum portrayed Boggs as having been killed to stop his probe into the assassination.

He served as majority whip from 1962 to 1971 and as majority leader from January 1971 to his disappearance. As the whip, he ushered much of President Johnson's Great Society legislation through Congress.

On August 22, 1968, while Secretary of State Dean Rusk was testifying in a hearing concerning the Vietnam War, Boggs interrupted the session to announce the invasion of Czechoslovakia by the troops of the Soviet Union, after hearing of a recent Radio Prague broadcast telling the Czechoslovaks not to take any action against the occupying forces. That caused Secretary Rusk, who was previously unaware of the situation, to excuse himself immediately, mid-testimony, to attend to the issue of the invasion. (Source: Walter Cronkite: The Way It Was: The 1960s)

In April 1971, he made a speech on the floor of the House in which he strongly attacked Federal Bureau of Investigation Director J. Edgar Hoover and the whole of the FBI.

That led to a conversation on April 6, 1971 between President Richard M. Nixon and the Republican minority leader, Gerald Ford. Nixon said that he could no longer take counsel from Boggs as a senior member of Congress. In the recording of this call, Nixon asked Ford to arrange for the House delegation to include an alternative to Boggs. Ford speculated that Boggs was either drinking too much or taking pills that were upsetting him mentally.

On April 22, 1971, Boggs went even further:
"Over the postwar years, we have granted to the elite and secret police within our system vast new powers over the lives and liberties of the people. At the request of the trusted and respected heads of those forces, and their appeal to the necessities of national security, we have exempted those grants of power from due accounting and strict surveillance."

Disappearance in Alaska

Disappearance and search
As majority leader, Boggs often campaigned for others, including Representative Nick Begich of Alaska. On October 16, 1972, Boggs was aboard a twin engine Cessna 310 with Representative Begich, who was facing a possible tight race in the November 1972 general election against the Republican candidate, Don Young, when it disappeared during a flight from Anchorage to Juneau. Also on board were Begich's aide, Russell Brown; and the pilot, Don Jonz; the four were heading to a campaign fundraiser for Begich.

The search for the missing aircraft and four men included the U.S. Coast Guard, Navy, Army, Air Force, Civil Air Patrol and civilian fixed-wing aircraft and helicopters.

The Cessna was required to carry an emergency locator transmitter per Alaska state law and federal law.

No emergency transmission signal determined to be from the plane was heard during the search. In its report on the incident, the National Transportation Safety Board stated that the pilot's portable emergency transmitter, permissible in lieu of a fixed transmitter on the plane, was found in an aircraft at Fairbanks, Alaska. The report also notes that a witness saw an unidentified object in the pilot's briefcase that resembled, except for color, the portable emergency transmitter. The safety board concluded that neither the pilot nor aircraft had an emergency location transmitter.

On November 24, 1972, the search was suspended after 39 days. Neither the wreckage of the plane nor the pilot's and passengers' remains were ever found. After a hearing and seven minute jury deliberation, his death certificate was signed by Judge Dorothy Tyner.

After Boggs and Begich were re-elected posthumously that November, House Resolution 1 of January 3, 1973, officially recognized Boggs's presumed death and opened the way for a special election. The same was done for Begich.

In 2019, Boggs's unexplained disappearance was mentioned in the fictional television series The Blacklist season 7 episode 14 "Twamie Ullulaq", which is set in the Alaska Triangle.

In summer 2020, Boggs's disappearance was investigated in a podcast produced by iHeartMedia called Missing in Alaska.

Personal life
In 1973, Boggs's wife since 1938, Lindy, was elected as a Democrat to the 93rd Congress, by special election, to the second district seat left vacant by her husband's death. She was reelected to the eight succeeding Congresses (March 20, 1973 – January 3, 1991) and retired after the 1990 election. In 1997, President Bill Clinton appointed Lindy Boggs U.S. Ambassador to the Holy See, in which capacity she served until 2001.

Hale and Lindy Boggs had four children: Cokie Roberts, who was a U.S. TV and public-radio journalist and the wife of journalist Steven V. Roberts; Thomas Hale Boggs Jr., who was a Washington, D.C.-based lawyer and lobbyist; Barbara Boggs Sigmund, who served as mayor of Princeton, New Jersey; and William Robertson Boggs, who died as an infant on December 28, 1946. In 1982, Sigmund lost a bid for the Democratic nomination for the U.S. Senate to Frank Lautenberg.

Boggs was a practicing Roman Catholic.

Tributes
The Hale Boggs Memorial Bridge, which spans the Mississippi River in St. Charles Parish, is named in memory of the former congressman. The visitor center at Portage Glacier in Southcentral Alaska (located within Chugach National Forest) is named the Begich, Boggs Visitor Center. Boggs Peak which is four miles north of the visitor center is also named for him. The Hale Boggs Federal Complex, at 500 Poydras Street in New Orleans, is also named after him.

In 1993, Boggs was among 13 politicians, past and present, inducted into the first class of the new Louisiana Political Museum and Hall of Fame in Winnfield.

See also

List of people who disappeared mysteriously at sea
List of United States Congress members who died in office
 List of members of the American Legion

Notes

References

 Boulard, Garry (2001), The Big Lie - Hale Boggs, Lucille May Grace and Leander Perez in 1951-52 
 Maney, Patrick J. "Hale Boggs: The Southerner as National Democrat" in Raymond W Smock and Susan W Hammond, eds. Masters of the House: Congressional Leadership Over Two Centuries (1998) pp 33–62.
 Strahan, Randall. "Thomas Brackett Reed and the Rise of Party Government" in Raymond W Smock and Susan W Hammond, eds. Masters of the House: Congressional Leadership Over Two Centuries (1998) pp 223–259.

External links

 
 
 Hale Boggs Telex — Debunked
 

|-

|-

|-

|-

|-

|-

|-

1914 births
1972 deaths
1970s missing person cases
20th-century American lawyers
20th-century American politicians
Accidental deaths in Alaska
Catholics from Louisiana
United States Navy personnel of World War II
American segregationists
Democratic Party members of the United States House of Representatives from Louisiana
Lawyers from New Orleans
Majority leaders of the United States House of Representatives
Members of the Warren Commission
Missing air passengers
Missing person cases in Alaska
People declared dead in absentia
People from Long Beach, Mississippi
Politicians elected posthumously
Politicians from New Orleans
Tulane University Law School alumni
United States Navy officers
Catholics from Mississippi
Boggs family
Claiborne family
Victims of aviation accidents or incidents in 1972
Victims of aviation accidents or incidents in the United States